Campsis, commonly known as trumpet creeper or trumpet vine, is a genus of flowering plants in the family Bignoniaceae, native to woodlands in China and North America. It consists of two species, both of which are vigorous deciduous perennial climbers, clinging by aerial roots, and producing large trumpet-shaped flowers in the summer. They are reasonably hardy and do well with the support of a wall, preferring full sun.

Species

 Campsis grandiflora K.Schum. – Chinese trumpet vine (East Asia)
 Campsis radicans Seem. – American trumpet vine (Southeastern United States)

Hybrids
 Campsis × tagliabuana (Madame Galen), a mid-19th century hybrid between Campsis grandiflora and  Campsis radicans

See also
 Trumpet flower (disambiguation)

References

External links

 
Bignoniaceae genera